The 2012 FIA WTCC Race of Morocco was the third round of the 2012 World Touring Car Championship season and the third running of the FIA WTCC Race of Morocco. It was held on 15 April 2012 at Marrakech Street Circuit in Marrakech, Morocco. Both races were won by Chevrolet with Alain Menu winning race one and Yvan Muller winning race two.

Background
After Valencia it was Chevrolet driver Yvan Muller who was leading the championship, 27 points clear of his nearest rival Menu who was three points clear of ROAL Motorsport driver Tom Coronel. Pepe Oriola was leading the Yokohama Independents' Trophy.

Having made his WTCC debut at Valencia, Fernando Monje would not return to race at Marrakech in preparation for his return to the European Touring Car Cup at the Slovakiaring. Gábor Wéber would also miss the event due to financial concerns, leaving Norbert Michelisz as the sole driver for Zengő Motorsport.

Report

Free Practice
Lukoil Racing Team's Gabriele Tarquini was fastest in the first free practice session ahead of the Chevrolets of Yvan Muller and Robert Huff. Team AON's Tom Chilton was a surprise fourth fastest, backing up his performance from Fridays test session. Franz Engstler was the fastest of the BMWs.

In the second session it was Menu was topped the times, his teammates Muller and Huff were second and third once again. Tarquini was the fastest SEAT in fourth ahead of Oriola and the Ford Focus of Chilton in sixth.

Qualifying
Menu continued his pace from the second free practice session to take pole position by 0.028s ahead of Huff. Muller and Coronel set benchmark times early on in Q2 but they had to settle for fourth and third respectively. Tiago Monteiro was tenth and looked to take pole position for race two. After Tarquini was removed from qualifying for running an underweight car, James Nash moved up to take pole position for race two.

Warm-Up
Yvan Muller was fastest in the Sunday morning warm up session with pole sitter Menu in fourth.

Race One
The Chevrolet trio of Menu, Huff and Muller led away from the start while behind them, Oriola made a great getaway and got ahead of Coronel for fourth. Local driver Mehdi Bennani and James Nash collided at the first turn, forcing both to retire. There was a brief scare for Alex MacDowall when he missed the braking point at turn 5 in his bamboo-engineering Chevrolet Cruze and collected the BMW of Coronel, both escaped any series damage and continued. The safety car was deployed while the stricken Ford of Nash was recovered with the race resuming on lap three. Isaac Tutumlu crashed his Proteam Racing into the wall at turn 4 and retired. On lap 5, Monteiro retired with gearbox problems in his SUNRED León. Menu led a Chevrolet 1-2-3 with Oriola the Yokohama Trophy winner in fourth. Chilton scored Ford's maiden points in the WTCC with a seventh-place finish.

Race Two
Nash led away from pole position while Coronel jumped up from eighth on the grid to third behind Engstler at the first corner. Chilton collected the rear bumper of Monteiro and dropped back down the field. Nash had to defend well from the BMW of Engstler until the German was overtaken by the Chevrolets of Muller and Huff on lap 4. On the following lap the two leading Chevrolets demoted Nash to third, one lap further on Menu also overtook the 2011 British Touring Car Championship Independents' Champion to secure third. Nash succumbed to attacks from Coronel and Stefano D'Aste on lap 9, while his teammate Chilton retired with turbo problems. At the finish, Muller led another Chevrolet 1-2-3 in reverse of the order they finished race one, D'Aste was the winning independent in fourth place and pole sitter Nash eventually finished sixth. After the race, the stewards issued bamboo-engineering driver Pasquale di Sabatino with a 30-second penalty for repeatedly cutting the chicanes, this dropped him from 12th to 15th in the classification.

Results

Qualifying

Bold denotes Pole position for second race.

Race 1

Bold denotes Fastest lap.

Race 2

Bold denotes Fastest lap.

Standings after the race

Drivers' Championship standings

Yokohama Independents' Trophy standings

Manufacturers' Championship standings

 Note: Only the top five positions are included for both sets of drivers' standings.

References

External links 

Morocco
Race of Morocco
FIA WTCC Race of Morocco